Ganapathy Manoharan (born 2 June 1958) is an Indian boxer. He competed in the men's bantamweight event at the 1980 Summer Olympics.

References

External links
 

1958 births
Living people
People from Vellore
Indian male boxers
Olympic boxers of India
Boxers at the 1980 Summer Olympics
Bantamweight boxers